Pioneer Secondary Alternative High School is a public alternative high school in Prineville, Oregon, United States.

Academics
In 2008, 29% of the school's seniors received their high school diploma. Of 56 students, 16 graduated, 29 dropped out, and 11 are still in high school.

References

High schools in Crook County, Oregon
Prineville, Oregon
Alternative schools in Oregon
Public high schools in Oregon